Francisco Javier Da Silva Irago (Vigo, Pontevedra 1979), better known as Kiko da Silva, is a Galician illustrator and cartoonist.

In April 2010 he obtained a 6,000 euros scholarship from the Art and Law Foundation that allowed him to face the realization of his first graphic novel, inspired by the novel or Xardín das Pedras floating by Manuel Lourenzo González.

In 2012, he founded in Pontevedra the first Professional School of comics and illustration in Galicia called O Garaxe Hermético.

References

External links 
Official blog
Kiko da Silva in Culturagalega.org
Official site of O Garaxe Hermético 

Living people
Spanish illustrators
Spanish cartoonists
People from Vigo
1979 births